Irene is a name derived from εἰρήνη (eirēnē), the Greek for "peace".

Irene, and related names, may refer to:

 Irene (given name)

Places
 Irene, Gauteng, South Africa
 Irene, South Dakota, United States
 Irene, Texas, United States
 Irene, West Virginia, United States
 Irene Lake, Quebec, Canada
 Lake Irene, a small lake in Rocky Mountain National Park, Colorado, United States
 Lake Irene, a lake in Minnesota, United States
 Irene River (Opawica River tributary), a tributary of the Opawica River in Quebec, Canada
 Irene River (New Zealand), a river of New Zealand
 Eirini metro station, an Athens metro station in Ano Maroussi, Greece

Storms and hurricanes
 Tropical Storm Irene (1947)
 Tropical Storm Irene (1959)
 Hurricane Irene–Olivia (1971)
 Hurricane Irene (1981), part of the 1981 Atlantic hurricane season
 Hurricane Irene (1999)
 Hurricane Irene (2005)
 Hurricane Irene (2011)

Arts and entertainment

Films and anime
 Irene (1926 film), an American silent film
 Irene (1940 film), an American film
 Irene (2002 film), a French film
 Irene (2009 film), a French film
 Irina Jelavić, a character in the manga and anime Assassination Classroom
 Eirene, a character in the anime SoltyRei
 Irene, the female protagonist of the 2011 movie Drive
 Irene Belserion, a character in the manga Fairy Tail
 Irene Moffat, a character in the 1987 American fantasy comedy movie Harry and the Hendersons

Literature
 Irene (play), a play written by Samuel Johnson between 1726 and 1749
 Irène (tragedy), a 1778 play by Voltaire
 "Irene", an 1831 poem by Edgar Allan Poe, also known as "The Sleeper"
 Irene Adler, a character in the Sherlock Holmes story "A Scandal in Bohemia"
 Destiny (Irene Adler), a Marvel Comics character
 Irene Redfield, a character in the novel Passing, by Nella Larsen
 Irene Forsyte, a character in The Forsyte Saga
 Irene Pollock, a character in the 44 Scotland Street series
 Irene Van de Kamp, a character in the Good Girls (comics) series
 Irene Kennedy, a character in multiple Mitch Rapp novels by Vince Flynn
 Princess Irene, the heroine of The Princess and the Goblin by George MacDonald
 The eponymous protagonist of Irene Iddesleigh by Amanda McKittrick Ros

Music
 Irene (musical), a 1919 Broadway musical
 Irene, a character in the opera Tamerlano by Handel
 Irene, a character in the opera Bajazet by Vivaldi
 "Irene", a song by Beach House on the 2012 album Bloom
 "Irene", a song by Mike Oldfield on the 2014 album Man on the Rocks
 "Irene", a song by tobyMac on the 2001 album Momentum

Television
 Irene the Concierge, a character in the TV series The Suite Life of Zack & Cody
 Irene Frederic, a character in the series Warehouse 13

Ships
 Irene (ketch), a 1907 sailing ship
 Irene (sternwheeler), a 1900s steamboat of the Puget Sound Mosquito Fleet
 Irene-class cruiser, of the German Imperial Navy
 , a German protected cruiser in service from 1887 to 1921
 HMS Princess Irene
 , a British refrigerated cargo liner in service from 1961 to 1970
 , a Greek-owned freighter
 , a Greek-owned supertanker
 TSS Irene (1885), a steam turbine cargo vessel in service from 1885 to 1906

Other uses
 Irene (singer), the stage name of Red Velvet's Bae Joo-hyun
 Irene (costume designer), American fashion designer and costume designer
 IRENE (technology), an optical method for playing sound recordings
 14 Irene, an asteroid
 Irene, in chemistry the hydrocarbon (CH3)4C10H8 formed by dehydration of irone
 A rosemary cultivar
 A brand name of desipramine, a tricyclic antidepressant
 Operation Irini, a European Union Naval Operation

See also 
 Eirene (disambiguation)
 Irina (disambiguation)
 Irena (disambiguation)
 Iren (disambiguation)